The 1968–69 IHL season was the 24th season of the International Hockey League, a North American minor professional league. Seven teams participated in the regular season, and the Dayton Gems won the Turner Cup.

Regular season

Turner Cup-Playoffs

External links
 Season 1968/69 on hockeydb.com

IHL
International Hockey League (1945–2001) seasons